Oaksey Halt is a closed station on the Golden Valley Line south of Kemble railway station and Kemble Tunnel on the line to .

There were short (150 ft) stone platforms, each with a small corrugated iron shelter. After the halt was closed in 1964, the platform on the up London Paddington line remained until October 2013 when it was dismantled as part of the Swindon to Kemble redoubling works.

References

External links
Oaksey Halt on navigable 1948 O.S. map

Former Great Western Railway stations
Disused railway stations in Wiltshire
Railway stations in Great Britain opened in 1929
Railway stations in Great Britain closed in 1964
Beeching closures in England